Bassingbourne Gawdy may refer to:
Bassingbourne Gawdy (died 1590), MP for Eye
Bassingbourne Gawdy (died 1606), MP for Thetford and Norfolk